Anthony Woodward Ivins (September 16, 1852 – September 23, 1934)  was an apostle of the Church of Jesus Christ of Latter-day Saints (LDS Church) and was a member of the church's First Presidency from 1921 until his death.

Early life and family 

Ivins was born in Toms River, New Jersey. When Ivins was still an infant, his parents migrated to Utah Territory. In 1861 they moved in St. George, Utah, as part of the original settling party for that city.

Ivins was a cousin of Heber J. Grant: Ivins's mother and Grant's mother were sisters, surnamed Ivins, and were distant cousins of Ivins's father. In 1878, Ivins married Elizabeth A. Snow, a daughter of Erastus Snow, an apostle; they had nine children. His son Antoine R. Ivins also served as a general authority of the LDS Church.

Politics and public service
On his return to St. George from an 1877 mission, Ivins was appointed a constable. He later served on the St. George city council and as a prosecuting attorney for Washington County, Utah. He served as mayor of St. George in the early 1890s. Under his administration the city built a canal to St. George.

After a mission to Mexico City, Ivins served as Mohave County Assessor, as special Indian Agent for the Shivwits band of Southern Paiutes, and as a delegate to the 1895 Utah State Constitutional Convention.

Ivins was an avid member of the Democratic Party.

Church service

In 1875, Ivins was part of an exploratory mission that found many sites in New Mexico and Arizona which were later colonized by the Mormons. In 1877, he served a mission to New Mexico, where he focused much of his attention on the Native Americans, but also preached to people of Mexican descent. 

In the years immediately after his marriage, he served as a member of the stake high council in St. George. In 1882, Ivins was called on a mission to Mexico City, where he served for about the next two years. He served as the first stake president in Colonia Juárez, Chihuahua; the Juárez Stake was the first stake in Mexico. Ivins served in this position until his call to the Quorum of the Twelve in 1907.

Ivins was ordained an apostle and joined the Quorum of the Twelve Apostles on October 6, 1907, after the death of George Teasdale. From 1918 to 1921, Ivins was the superintendent of the Young Men's Mutual Improvement Association. In 1921, Ivins was called as second counselor to Heber J. Grant in the First Presidency, and was replaced in the Quorum of the Twelve by Alonzo A. Hinckley. In 1925, Ivins became the first counselor to Grant in the First Presidency, and he served in this position until his death.

Death
Ivins died in Salt Lake City of a coronary occlusion. He was buried at Salt Lake City Cemetery.

Honors
The small city of Ivins, Utah, is named after him. Ivins Mountain, located in Zion National Park, was named after him in 1935. In 1958, he was inducted into the Hall of Great Westerners of the National Cowboy & Western Heritage Museum for his contributions to the cattle industry.

References

1852 births
1934 deaths
American cattlemen
American general authorities (LDS Church)
People from St. George, Utah
People from Toms River, New Jersey
Utah Democrats
Apostles (LDS Church)
Counselors in the First Presidency (LDS Church)
General Presidents of the Young Men (organization)
Burials at Salt Lake City Cemetery
American Mormon missionaries in Mexico
Mission presidents (LDS Church)
19th-century Mormon missionaries
Latter Day Saints from Utah
Mayors of places in Utah